= Maison Baar-Lecharlier =

Coordinates: 50°38′36″N 5°34′27″E

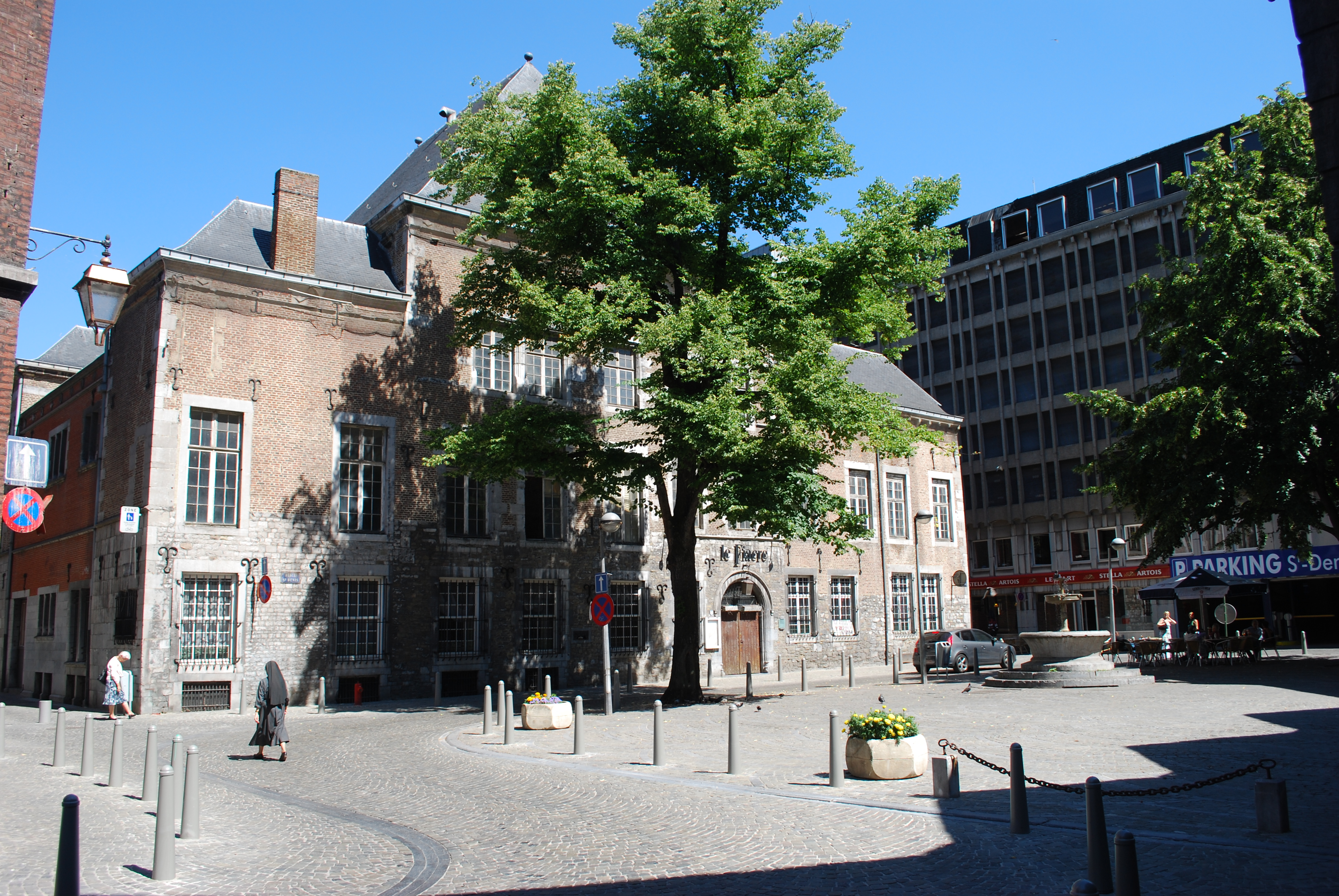
- Interactive map of Maison Baar-Lecharlier
- Location: Liège, Belgium
- Builder: Jean Brictius
- Completion date: 1564

The maison Baar-Lecharlier (or hôtel Baar-Lecharlier) is located in Liège, Belgium.

== History ==
The Gothic-Renaissance style building was erected in 1564 by Jean Brictius, dean of Saint-Denis. In the 16th century, it became the imperial post office of Cologne. This canonical house originally consisted of two separate buildings joined by an addition at the end of the 19th century. The house is named after the couple "Baar-Lecharlier", textile merchants who acquired part of the building in 1870 and the whole building in 1910. In the 20th century, it housed the 1st Police Division before housing a restaurant in the 1980s which gave the building its nickname "Le Fiacre". The restaurant closed its doors in 2005 and the building was abandoned for several years.

Between 2011 and 2013, the building was occupied by an association offering an exhibition gallery and a space equipped for concerts.

Archaeological studies initiated in the 2000s and 2010s led to the discovery of a 16th-century wall painting in 2017.

A renovation project is being carried out by Meusinvest; the building is expected to house a “creative hub” which is part of the broader “Liège creative district” project.
